Mahmoud Salah (born October 10, 1994) is an Egyptian professional footballer who plays as a left midfielder for the Egyptian club ENPPI SC

Career
In July 2017, Salah renewed his contract with Al-Assiouty for 3 years after their promotion to 2017–18 Egyptian Premier League.

References

External links
Mahmoud Salah Abdel-Naser at KOOORA.com
Mahmoud Salah at Footballdatabase

1994 births
Living people
Egyptian footballers
Association football midfielders
Pyramids FC players
Petrojet SC players
ENPPI SC players
Egyptian Premier League players